Sheregesh (Russian and ) is an urban locality (an urban-type settlement) in Tashtagolsky District of Kemerovo Oblast, Russia. Population:  Postal code: 652971. The main ethnic groups are Russians and Shors.

History and economy
Sheregesh is named after brothers Sheregeshevy, who struck iron ore in 1912.

Ski resort 
Since the early 2000s Sheregesh is known as a ski resort and is continuously developing. 

As of 2018, 19 ski lifts operate in Sheregesh ski resort, open from 9 to 17. Since 2015 lift pass for use on all ski lifts is available.

Grelka fest 
In April, the main event of Sheregesh, the music festival "Grelka Fest", traditionally takes place, where every year skiers in swimsuits simultaneously descend from the mountain.

Weather 
The climate of Sheregesh is continental: winters are usually cold and snowy; summers are short and warm.  The snow mantle reaches four meters.

Hotels
At least 50 hotels operate in Sheregesh.

References

External links

Worldsnowboardguide.com. Information about Sheregesh
Sheregesh skiing center 

Urban-type settlements in Kemerovo Oblast
Ski areas and resorts in Russia